The coat of arms of Aragon was first chronicled in 1499 by Pablo Hurus. The coat displays Aragon through the years from its establishment to their monarchy and is made up of four shields:  

First quarter: The Sobrarbe tree or the Ainsa shield represents the legendary Kingdom of Sobrarbe and the establishment of Aragonese liberty. 

Second quarter: The Cross of Íñigo Arista represents the Pyrenees and the old Aragonese monarchy. 

Third quarter:  The St George's Cross or "Four Moors flag" consists of a red cross of St George against a white background with a 'Maure' or head of a Moor in each quarter - also known as the "Cross of Alcoraz" which became the war flag of the Reconquista following the "Battle of Alcoraz" in 1096, when, according to tradition, the Kingdom of Aragon regained territory from the Moors under the auspices of Saint George.  This quarter also inspired the coat of arms and flag of Sardinia and Corsica, former territories of the Crown of Aragon in the 14th and 15th centuries.

Fourth quarter: The Bars of Aragon represents the familiar coat of arms of the Kings of Aragon that took over all territories within the Crown of Aragon.

See also 
Flag of Aragon
Coat of arms of the Crown of Aragon

References

 
Aragon
Aragon
Aragon
Aragon
Aragon